The NER Class L (LNER Class J73) was a class of 0-6-0T steam locomotives of the North Eastern Railway. They were a specialised design, intended for use on the Redheugh and Quayside banks on either side of the River Tyne. They were replaced on the Quayside branch by NER Class ES1 electric locomotives in 1905 but were re-allocated to other duties.

Overview
The Class L was Wilson Worsdell's first design for the NER. Unusually for a Wilson Worsdell design, they were fitted with Joy valve gear instead of the Stephenson valve gear fitted to his later locomotives.

British Railways
All 10 locomotives survived into British Railways ownership in 1948 and their BR numbers were 68355-68364.  They were all withdrawn between 1955 and 1960. None have been preserved.

References

0-6-0T locomotives
L
Railway locomotives introduced in 1891
Scrapped locomotives
Standard gauge steam locomotives of Great Britain